The University of North Dakota women's ice hockey team represents the University of North Dakota in the WCHA women's ice hockey conference. The team will attempt to qualify for the NCAA Frozen Four for the second time.

Offseason

Recruiting

Regular season

Current record

Current rankings

North Dakota statistics

2012-13 schedule and results 
  Green background indicates regulation or overtime win. 
  Red background indicates regulation or overtime loss.
  White background indicates tie or overtime tie.

Notes:

(EX) Denotes an exhibition game

† Denotes a non-conference game

Awards and honors
Meghan Dufault, WCHA Rookie of the Week (Week of January 9, 2013)

References

North Dakota
North Dakota Fighting Hawks women's ice hockey seasons
2012 in sports in North Dakota
2013 in sports in North Dakota